Federal elections were held in Germany on 20 February 1890. The Centre Party regained its position as the largest party in the Reichstag by winning 107 of the 397 seats, whilst the National Liberal Party, formerly the largest party, was reduced to 38 seats. 

Contemporaries remarked on the striking increase in the vote share of the Social Democratic Party. However, despite receiving the most votes, the Social Democratic Party won only 35 seats. Voter turnout was 71.5%.

Results

Alsace-Lorraine

References

Federal elections in Germany
Germany
1890 elections in Germany
Elections in the German Empire
February 1890 events